Luciano Milo (born 29 April 1980 in Rome) is an Italian former ice dancer. He had the most success with partner Federica Faiella. With Faiella, he is the 2000 Italian national silver medalist, two time World Junior silver medalist, and 1997/1998 Junior Grand Prix Final Champion. They ended their partnership after the 1999/2000 season, when they placed 11th at the European Figure Skating Championships. Milo then teamed up with Gloria Agogliati and skated with her for one season. They won the bronze medal at the 2001 Italian Nationals.

Programs 
(with Agogliati)

Competitive highlights

With Agogliati

With Faiella

References

External links 
 

1980 births
Living people
Sportspeople from Rome
Italian male ice dancers
World Junior Figure Skating Championships medalists